Dallas Harris is an American politician from Nevada. A Democrat, Harris was appointed to the 11th district of the Nevada Senate on December 4, 2018.

Prior to her appointment to the legislature, Harris served with the Nevada Public Utilities Commission as an administrative attorney.

Harris is openly gay. She is one of four openly LGBT members of the Nevada state legislature, alongside senators David Parks, Pat Spearman and Melanie Scheible.

References

External links

 Profile at the Nevada Senate
 Campaign website

Nevada lawyers
Democratic Party Nevada state senators
Living people
Women state legislators in Nevada
21st-century American politicians
21st-century American women politicians
Year of birth missing (living people)
Lesbian politicians
LGBT state legislators in Nevada
21st-century LGBT people